The Cross of the Martyrs refers to either of two cross-shaped monuments erected in the 20th century in Santa Fe, New Mexico that commemorate the deaths of 21 Catholic clergy during the Pueblo Revolt (the eponymous 'martyrs'). The earlier of the two is near the Old Taos Highway, on La Cruz Road, which is named after the memorial. The Midland Bridge Company made it for the designers Ralph Emerson Twitchell, Edgar L. Street, and Warren G. Turley out of reinforced concrete. The cross was dedicated during the 1920 Fiestas de Santa Fe. The Historic Santa Fe Foundation and the Fiesta Council commissioned in 1994 a second Cross of the Martyrs, this one of steel, near Fort Marcy.

Gallery

References 

Monuments and memorials in New Mexico